The Dana Cup, one of the world's largest football tournaments, takes place every year in the North Jutland town of Hjørring in Denmark at the end of July.  In 2008 there were over 25,000 participants (players, coaches and referees) from all around the world. It is advertised by the organisers as "the world's most international youth soccer tournament" since over the years, they claim it has had the largest number of participating countries of any international football tournament. First held in 1982, the tournament celebrated its 25th anniversary in 2006.

Tournament format 

The tournament caters to boys and girls teams, organised into age groups ranging from U12 to U19.  In the first phase of play, games are played in a round-robin format with groups of 4 or 5 teams.  Based on their results in this first phase, teams advance into either the 'A' or 'B' finals brackets where games are played in a knockout format.

Gallery

References

External links
 
 2019 Dana Cup Tours

International association football competitions hosted by Denmark
Football cup competitions in Denmark
Youth football competitions